Dale Phillips (born 15 October 1998) is a New Zealand cricketer. He made his first-class debut on 21 October 2019, for Otago in the 2019–20 Plunket Shield season. Prior to his first-class debut, he was named in New Zealand's squads for the 2016 Under-19 Cricket World Cup and the 2018 Under-19 Cricket World Cup. He made his List A debut on 17 November 2019, for Otago in the 2019–20 Ford Trophy. He made his Twenty20 debut on 30 December 2019, for Otago in the 2019–20 Super Smash.

In June 2020, he was offered a contract by Otago ahead of the 2020–21 domestic cricket season.

References

External links
 

1998 births
Living people
New Zealand cricketers
Otago cricketers
Place of birth missing (living people)
South African emigrants to New Zealand
Cricketers from Johannesburg